This outline is provided as an overview of, and topical guide to Harvard University:

Harvard University – private Ivy League university located in Cambridge, Massachusetts, United States, established in 1636 by the Massachusetts legislature. Harvard is the oldest institution of higher learning in the United States and the first corporation (officially The President and Fellows of Harvard College) chartered in the country.

Governing structure
The President and Fellows of Harvard College ("Harvard Corporation")
Office of the President
Fellows
Harvard Board of Overseers
Secretary
Treasurer
Harvard University endowment
University Marshall
Memorial Church
Office of the Provost
University Library
Executive Vice President

Departments
Financial Administration
Campus Services
Health Services
Human Resources
Information Technology (HUIT)
Planning and Project Management
Office of the General Counsel
Public Affairs & Communications
Alumni Affairs & Development

History

History of Harvard University
The Commonwealth of Massachusetts Constitution
Chapter V. "THE UNIVERSITY AT CAMBRIDGE, AND ENCOURAGEMENT OF LITERATURE, ETC.
Section 1. The University"

Faculties (schools)
Faculty of Arts and Sciences
Harvard College
School of Engineering and Applied Sciences (formerly Division)
Graduate School of Arts and Sciences
Division of Continuing Education
Summer School
Extension School
Faculty of Business
Harvard Business Publishing
Faculty of Design
Faculty of Divinity
Faculty of Education
Faculty of Government
Faculty of Law
Faculty of Public Health
Faculty of Medicine
School of Dental Medicine

Campuses
Boston-Allston
Campus of the Harvard Business School
Barry's Corner
Boston--Longwood Medical Area
Campus of the Harvard Medical School
Boston—Jamaica Plain
Arnold Arboretum
Cambridge-Harvard Square
Harvard Houses Historic District
Harvard Yard
Campus of the Harvard Divinity School
Campus of the Harvard Law School
Campus of Radcliffe College
Radcliffe Quadrangle
Radcliffe Yard
Center for Astrophysics  Harvard & Smithsonian
Petersham
Harvard Forest

People affiliated with Harvard University
John Harvard

Alumni
List of Harvard University non-graduate alumni
By nationality
By occupation
By school
List of Harvard Business School alumni
List of Harvard Divinity School alumni
List of Harvard Law School alumni

Faculty

Harvard's faculty includes numerous renowned scholars including: 
(biologists) E. O. Wilson and William Kaelin; 
(biophysicists) Adam Cohen and Xiaowei Zhuang; 
(physicists) Lisa Randall, Subir Sachdev, and Howard Georgi; 
(astrophysicists) Alyssa A. Goodman and John M. Kovac; 
(mathematicians) Shing-Tung Yau and Joe Harris; 
(computer scientists) Michael O. Rabin and Leslie Valiant; 
(chemists) Elias Corey, Dudley R. Herschbach, and George M. Whitesides; 
(literary critics) Helen Vendler, Stephen Greenblatt, Louis Menand, and Stephanie Burt; 
(composers) Robert D. Levin and Bernard Rands; 
(lawyers) Alan Dershowitz and Lawrence Lessig; 
(historians) Henry Louis Gates, Jr. and Niall Ferguson, 
(psychologists) Steven Pinker and Daniel Gilbert; 
(economists) Amartya Sen, Greg Mankiw, Robert Barro, Stephen Marglin, Jason Furman, Michael Kremer, Oliver Hart, Raj Chetty, Lawrence Summers, and Eric Maskin; 
(philosophers) Harvey Mansfield, Shirley Williams, Cornel West, and Michael Sandel; 
(political scientists) Robert Putnam, Steven Levitsky, Danielle Allen, and Joseph Nye.

Past faculty members included: 
Stephen Jay Gould, Robert Nozick, Stephan Thernstrom, Sanford J. Ungar, 
Michael Walzer, Martin Feldstein, Roy Glauber, and Stanley Hoffmann.

Fellows

Honorees

Sports
Baseball team
Basketball Men's / Women's teams
Crew teams.
Fencing team
Football team
Lacrosse Men's / Women's teams
Rowing team
Tennis team
Volleyball Men's / Women's teams
Wrestling team

Events and activities
Harvard–Radcliffe Women's Leadership Project
Head of the Charles Regatta
Primal Scream
Tours of Harvard University
Traditions of Harvard University
History and traditions of Harvard commencements

Buildings and structures

Athletics facilities

Housing

Libraries
Baker Library
Countway Center for the History of Medicine
Gutman Library
Houghton Library
Lamont Library
Quad Library
Widener Library

Museums
Arnold Arboretum – Jamaica Plain/Roslindale
Harvard Forest – Petersham, MA
Harvard Museum of Natural History
Harvard Art Museums
Peabody Museum

Public art

Associated organizations

Affiliated hospitals
Beth Israel Deaconess Medical Center
Boston Children's Hospital
Brigham and Women's Hospital
Cambridge Hospital
Dana–Farber Cancer Institute
Joslin Diabetes Center
Massachusetts General Hospital
Massachusetts Eye and Ear
Schepens Eye Research Institute

Alumni organizations

Media and publications
The Harvard Crimson
Harvard Business Review
Harvard Educational Review
Harvard Law Review
Radio broadcasting
WHRB
Television broadcasting
Harvard Undergraduate Television (HUTV), formerly Harvard-Radcliffe Television
Ivory Tower (Harvard Undergraduate Television)
Harvard Internet broadcasts

Student organizations

Research centers
 Harvard Ukrainian Research Institute

Other
Ivy League
Harvard/MIT Cooperative Society
Harvard University Employees Credit Union

Miscellaneous
Archival depository at Harvard University
Crimson
Employment at Harvard University
Online learning at Harvard University
Harvard mascot(s)
Harvard (name)
Harvard (trademark)
University Asks That Harvard Pilgrim Trademark Case Be Heard in Federal
Harvard University and the ROTC
Harvard University fifty-year plan
Harvard University admissions and enrollment
Harvard University criticism and controversies
The John Harvard statue controversy
Gender at Harvard University
Ethnicity at Harvard University
Harvard University endowments
Harvard University sponsorship
Harvard University Health Services
Internet2
Protests at Harvard University
Rankings for Harvard University
School dress at Harvard University

Images

Art at Harvard University

Buildings and structures

Maps

Logos

Shields

See also
List of colleges and universities in the United States by endowment
Index of Harvard University-related articles

References

External links 

 
Harvard University
Harvard University